Chinese propaganda may refer to:

Propaganda in China
Propaganda in the Republic of China (Taiwan)